Mowrey is a surname. Notable people with the surname include:

Dent Mowrey (1888–1960), American composer, musician, and music teacher 
Dude Mowrey (born 1972), American country music artist
Mike Mowrey (1884–1947), American baseball player